Fergus Johnston (born 21 May 1959) is an Irish composer and member of Aosdána.

Life and career
Johnston was born in Dublin, the son of the physicist and political activist Roy H. W. Johnston, and studied for both a degree in music and a master's degree in Music and Media Technology  at Trinity College Dublin (MusB 1982). He also has a PhD in composition from the National University of Ireland, Maynooth. Initially he had also studied at the Royal Irish Academy of Music, Dublin (flute with Doris Keogh, clarinet with Tim Hanafin, and composition with James Wilson). In 1985 he was invited by the European Community Youth Orchestra to write an orchestral piece under the guidance of György Ligeti. 1989-91 he was Chairman of the Association of Irish Composers. He completed his education with the English composer Robert Hanson.

Johnston's output includes works for both orchestra and smaller ensembles, some works of which include electronics, and two operas. His music has been performed at many venues and festivals including the 1985 Asolo Musica Festival in Italy, the 1996 International Society for Contemporary Music Festival, the 2001 Sonorities Festival of Contemporary Music in Belfast, and Raidió Teilifís Éireann's 2005 Living Music Festival. His use of system is unusual among Irish composers, his compositional process typically including a significant element of pre-planning.

Selected works

Stage
 Bitter Fruit (Nell McCafferty) (1992), chamber opera
 The Earl of Kildare (Celia de Fréine) (2008), opera

Orchestral works
 Samsara (1991)
 Flute Concerto (1996; rev. 2003)
 Je goûte le jeu ... (1997), for string orchestra
 Wind Symphony (1998), for wind band
 Through Hollow Lands (2002)
 Binn an tSíorsholais (2004)
 Wexford Suite (2005)
 Brahms Begins the Day (2006)
 Scenes and Interludes from 'The Earl of Kildare (2008)Chamber music Timon of Athens (William Shakespeare), incidental music (1983), 2fl, 2cl+bcl, bn, vn, gui, perc, 3 speakers
 Reflections (1984), ob, 2cl, bn, hp, vib, str qt
 Brass Quintet (1985)
 Episodes 1 (1986), fl, trb, egui, perc
 Episodes 2 (1987), fl, ob, cl
 Signals! (1989), vn, dancers (opt.)
 Incantations (1989), cl+bcl, perc
 Cusp (1992), vn, pf
Kaleidophone (1992; rev. 1996), 2vn, va, vc, hp, perc
 Gabor Haenjo’s Variations on a Theme by Paganini (1993), cl, vc, pf
 Carn (1993), 2pf
 Líofa (1994), fl, cor ang, bcl, hn, str qt
 Opus Lepidipterae (1996), fl, pf/arec, gui/fl, hpd
 Piano Trio (2012)
 Toccata, Fugue, and A Camel's Swan-Song (2013), vc, pf
 String Quartet (2015), vn, va, vc, dbSolo instrumental Three Pieces for Double Bass (1980)
 Pavan and Galliard (1984), guitar
 Two Pieces for Solo Flute (1987)
 Prelude & Passacaglia (1987), violin
 Psyche (1992), alto recorder
 creepy crawlies (1993), piano
 Prelude (1993), piano
 Three Piano Pieces (1995)
 Éagaoineadh (1995), piano
 The Oul’ Winda Rag (1996), piano
 Rashad's Words (1999), percussion
 Lord Leonard Gray, His March (2006), piano
 Three Bulgarian Dances (2007), organ
 Miniatures for Scott (2015), pianoVocal Two T’ang Poems (Li Ho) (1984), soprano and chamber orchestra
 The Wisdom of the World (1990), mezzo and Irish harp
 After a Childhood Away from Ireland (Eavan Boland) (1997), soprano and piano
 Five Oriental Texts (2015), soprano and chamber orchestraChoral Three Songs on Words by e.e.cummings (1981; rev. 1982), S, fl, cl, bn
 now I lay (with everywhere around) (e.e. cummings) (1983), satb
 Praise Music (Psalms) (1988), satb
 Sine musica nulla vita (1988), ssatb
 The Little Snowgirl (1991), A, B, children's vv, female vv, orch
 Psalm 84 (1996; rev. 1997), satb & organElectro-acoustic'''
 Morríghan (2000), baroque fl, hpd, live electronics
 Méadú (2001), vn, pf, tape
 Árd Fhearta (2001), 2ob, 2fl, 2cl, 2bn, 2tpt, 2trb, tb, bronze-age hn, live electronics

RecordingsSamsara, performed by Ruse Philharmonic Orchestra, Tsanko Delibosov (cond), on: Vienna Modern Masters VMM 3035 (CD, 1996).Kaleidophone, performed by Concorde, on: Contemporary Music Centre CD02 (promotional CD, 1997).Je goûte le jeu ..., performed by Irish Chamber Orchestra, Fionnuala Hunt (cond), on: Black Box Music BBM 1013 (CD, 1998).Árd Fhearta; Carn; Signals; Samsara, performed by Reamonn Keary (pf), Shirin Goudarze-Tobin & Frantisek Jaros (vn), Ruse Philharmonic Orchestra, Tsanko Delibosov (cond), on: Monumental Music MOMU 014 (CD, 2001).Three Bulgarian Pieces, performed by Vox 21, on: RTÉ lyric fm CD 123 (CD, 2009).
Piano Trio, performed by Fidelio Trio, on: Metier MSV 28556 (CD, 2015).

Honours and awards
1989 – Macaulay Fellowship, Arts Council of Ireland
1992 – Elected to Aosdána, Ireland's Academy of Arts.
1996-2001 - Appointed as member of the Board of Directors of the National Concert Hall of Ireland, An Ceoláras Náisiúnta.

References

Sources
Arts Council of Ireland reference page
Fergus Johnston at the Contemporary Music Centre of Ireland
Axel Klein: Die Musik Irlands im 20. Jahrhundert (Hildesheim: Georg Olms, 1996)The Encyclopaedia of Music in Ireland'', ed. H. White & B. Boydell (Dublin: UCD Press, 2013)

External links
Fergus Johnston's website
Scores by Fergus Johnston
Arts Council of Ireland reference page
Fergus Johnston at the Contemporary Music Centre of Ireland

1959 births
20th-century classical composers
21st-century classical composers
Aosdána members
Electroacoustic music composers
Irish classical composers
Irish male classical composers
Irish opera composers
Living people
Male opera composers
Modernist composers
Musicians from Dublin (city)
20th-century male musicians
21st-century male musicians